Asgaut Olsen Regelstad (1761  –  8 January 1847) was a Norwegian farmer and bailiff who served as a representative at the Norwegian Constituent Assembly at Eidsvoll in 1814.

Asgaut Olsen Regelstad was born at the farm Nådå on Finnøy in Rogaland, Norway.  He was raised on the neighboring Reilstad farm. He was the eldest of four children born to Ole Asgautsen (1764-1773) and Anna Reiersdatter (1736-1775). He was a farmer on Reilstad in Finney. He was also sheriff of Finney from 1816 to 1823. Additionally he was a member of the school commission, served as lay assistant to the parish priest and served as a magistrate judge.

He represented Stavanger amt (now Rogaland)  at the Norwegian Constituent Assembly together with Lars Andreas Oftedahl and Christen Mølbach. At Eidsvoll, he was the only farmer at the Assembly from Stavanger. He generally supported the independence party (Selvstendighetspartiet) and  approved of a proposal to sell church property.

References

Related Reading
Holme Jørn (2014) De kom fra alle kanter - Eidsvollsmennene og deres hus  (Oslo: Cappelen Damm) 

1761 births
1847 deaths
People from Finnøy
Norwegian farmers
Rogaland politicians
Fathers of the Constitution of Norway